"Kemonotachi no Yoru/RONDO" (獣たちの夜/RONDO) is the 38th single by the Japanese rock band Buck-Tick, released on May 22, 2019 on the label Lingua Sounda. The song "Rondo" is used as the ending theme for the GeGeGe no Kitaro anime since episode 50. Cube Juice, the project of the music producer Nagao Shinichi, participates in track 3 with Kemonotachi no Yoru's remix. The track Kemonotachi no Yoru, in a different version, is part of the album Abracadabra.

Charts 
The single peaked at the 4th position on the Oricon charts.

Track listing

Personnel 
 Atsushi Sakurai - singing
 Hisashi Imai - lead guitar
 Hidehiko "Hide" Hoshino- rhythm guitar
 Yutaka "U-ta" Higuchi- bass
 Yagami Toll - drums

Additional musicians 
 Cube Juice - remix (track 3)

References

External links
 
 

Buck-Tick songs
Japanese-language songs
2019 singles
Songs with music by Hisashi Imai
Songs with lyrics by Atsushi Sakurai